Arz or ARZ may refer to:

Places 
 Arz (river), in Brittany, France
 Île-d'Arz, an archipelago in Brittany, France
 Cedars of God, a forest in Lebanon

Sport 
 Arizona Cardinals
 Arizona Diamondbacks
 Arizona Coyotes

Other uses
 Al Arz, an Arabic newspaper published in Lebanon between 1895 and 1916
 Arz missile, a Lebanese surface-to-surface missile
 Arz von Wasegg, a South Tyrolean noble family
 Arz (rapper), a rapper who had a hit in the UK in 2021 with the track Alone With You
 Egyptian Arabic (ISO 639 language code: arz), a dialect of Arabic
 N'zeto Airport in Angola